Paolo Caronni (c. 1779–1842) was an Italian engraver. He was born in Monza. He was a pupil of Giuseppe Longhi. He died at Milan. Among his plates are: 
Vision of Ezekiel after Raphael. 1825.Alexander and Darius (1818).Venus suckling the Infant Cupid after Parmigianino.Venus stealing Cupid's Bow after Procaccini.The Virgin and Child after Sassoferrato (painter).The Triumph of David after Domenichino.A Portrait of Raffaelo Morghen''.

References

1779 births
1842 deaths
People from Monza
Italian engravers